H. Wade MacLauchlan CM OPEI (born 10 December 1954), is a Canadian legal academic, university administrator, politician and community leader. He served as the fifth president of the University of Prince Edward Island from 1999 to 2011, becoming president emeritus in 2012. He served as the 32nd premier of Prince Edward Island from 2015 to 2019. His government was defeated in the April 23, 2019 general election. MacLauchlan announced his intention to step down as Liberal leader on 26 April 2019, and completed his term as Premier on 9 May 2019.

Early life, education and career
MacLauchlan was born on 10 December 1954, the third of five children of Harry and Marjorie MacLauchlan, living in Stanhope, Prince Edward Island. Stanhope is the oldest Scottish community on PEI, with the first Scottish settlers arriving on the ship "Falmouth" in June 1770. The MacLauchlan's were early residents of Stanhope, with a large extended family in Stanhope and numerous other rural PEI communities.

MacLauchlan was born into an entrepreneurial household. The family lived initially in an apartment above a country general store that his father Harry started at Stanhope in 1946 at the age of nineteen. Harry and Marjorie MacLauchlan were businesspeople involved in tourism, fisheries, heavy construction, and several other ventures through the 1960s. By the age of 10, Wade had two newspaper routes along with his cousin, selling The Guardian in the morning and The Evening Patriot in the afternoon. He would later recall that the only advice offered by his father regarding what was a fairly sizeable business venture for two youngsters was that they should read the newspaper before selling it; "In other words, the most important thing in business is to know what you're talking about."

MacLauchlan's parents went on to other ventures including MacLauchlan's Motel in Charlottetown, expanding the heavy construction business and getting in to cable television, golf courses, oil and gas distribution, and real estate. MacLauchlan worked in many of those ventures with jobs such as weighing and salting fish, collecting garbage, building golf course greens, and carrying suitcases. In the summer of 1974, at the age of 19, he headed further afield, working as a guide on cross-Canada bus tours.

After completing his first eight years of education, MacLauchlan went from the two-room school at Stanhope to study at Charlottetown Rural High. Along with his studies, MacLauchlan was involved in student politics as vice-president of Student Council and chair of the organizing committee for the annual Winter Carnival. A key formative experience came when MacLauchlan was nominated by his high school teachers to serve as a page in the PEI provincial legislature for two years in 1970 and 1971 at the height of the Comprehensive Development Plan and Alex Campbell's premiership.

MacLauchlan went on to earn an undergraduate Bachelor of Business Administration degree from the University of Prince Edward Island, followed by a Bachelor of Laws from the University of New Brunswick and a Master of Laws from Yale University. While at UPEI, he served two terms as an elected student representative on University Senate. Upon graduating in 1976, MacLauchlan was awarded the Owen MacDonald Memorial Award, presented to a graduate by the senior class for excellence and outstanding contribution to the class. At UNB Law School, MacLauchlan held the Beaverbrook Scholarship in Law, was elected to serve for two terms on Law Faculty Council and was awarded the Lieutenant Governor's Medal on graduation. MacLauchlan attended Yale Law School with the O'Brien Scholarship and Yale Law Scholarship.

Following graduation from UPEI, MacLauchlan took a double gap year, working and traveling widely from 1976 to 1978. He worked as road construction labourer in Northern Quebec, as a hotel clerk at Jasper Park Lodge, as a roughneck on an oil rig in west-central Alberta, and as a volunteer recycler in southern France.

Academic career 
In the year following graduation from UNB Law, MacLauchlan was awarded a clerkship at the Supreme Court of Canada, where he was the sole law clerk for Justice W.Z. Estey. 1981–82 was an active year for the Supreme Court, beginning with the delivery in late September of opinions in the famous Patriation Reference. The Court's decision led to first ministers meetings that in turn paved the way for patriation of the Canadian constitution, adoption of the Constitution Act, 1982, and enshrinement of the Canadian Charter of Rights and Freedoms.

MacLauchlan began his teaching and academic career as an assistant professor, later promoted to associate professor, at Dalhousie Law School from 1983 to 1991. During this time, he served for six years as director of the federal government's Civil Law-Common Law Exchange Program. MacLauchlan was active in the Canadian Association of Law Teachers, including as chair of a Special Advisory Committee on Equality in Legal Education, which produced the report Equality in Legal Education: Sharing a Vision, Creating the Pathways. His main teaching and scholarly focus was in administrative and public law. From 1990 to 1993, he was the administrative law editor of the Supreme Court Law Review.

MacLauchlan was Dean of Law at the University of New Brunswick from 1991 to 1996. As dean, he led the establishment of the $1.5 million Heritage Fund on the occasion of the law school's centenary in 1991–92. During this period, UNB's law faculty became known as "Canada's great small law school," a title it retains today. In 1993–94, MacLauchlan was chair of the university-wide faculty-staff component of UNB's Venture Campaign, launching what became a successful $40 million initiative. From 1997 to 1999, MacLauchlan served as founding director of UNB's multi-disciplinary Centre for Property Studies.

UPEI President
In 1999, MacLauchlan was appointed as the fifth president of the University of Prince Edward Island, the first PEI native to serve in the role. At the time of his appointment, MacLauchlan said, "We can be as great as any university in this country. We may not be as big, but we can be as good." With declining youth populations, enrolment was identified as a challenge for UPEI and other Atlantic universities. At the outset, MacLauchlan suggested a target of increasing full-time student enrolment to 2700 students (at the time, FT enrolment was 2450.) That target was surpassed within two years; UPEI had more than 2850 full-time students in 2001–02. By 2010–11, enrolment at UPEI grew to just under 4000 full-time students. This reflected increased numbers of students from Prince Edward Island and elsewhere in Canada, in conjunction with a five-fold increase in both international students and students enrolled in graduate programs. During these years, UPEI's standing in the annual Maclean's University Rankings rose from #18 (of 21) among Primarily Undergraduate universities in 2000 to #5 (of 21) in 2006 and was consistently in the top 10.

A second target identified by MacLauchlan when he became UPEI president was to double the amount of funding for research and development (in 1999, external research funding was $2 million annually.) By 2002, external research funding at UPEI increased to $5.2 million. Total annual research funding further increased by more than 150% to $13.2 million between 2002 and 2007, earning UPEI recognition as the top Canadian undergraduate university for research funding growth during the five-year period. Beginning in 2002, MacLauchlan served as co-chair of a Technology Roadmap Steering Committee that brought together leaders from industry with university scientists, government funding partners and representatives of the federal National Research Council to secure funding approval in 2003 for the establishment of the NRC's Institute of NutriSciences and Health on the UPEI campus. Other signal research achievements included the establishment of a number of prestigious Canada Research Chairs (CRCs). By 2008, UPEI had been awarded six CRCs. In 2009 UPEI secured one of only ten inaugural Canada Excellence Research Chairs awarded to universities across Canada, in the relatively new discipline of aquatic epidemiology. Growth the research and development portfolio at UPEI and the Atlantic Veterinary College coincided with expansion of graduate programs in a range of disciplines, with enrolments increasing from 53 graduate students in 1999–2000 to 260 graduate students in 2011–12.

Teaching and learning remained a top priority and area of excellence for UPEI. MacLauchlan committed to be in the classroom to teach as many UPEI students as possible. He did so by teaching students in English 101 classes about the importance of writing and by offering guest lectures in other first year and upper year courses. UPEI continued to demonstrate a commitment to teaching and learning through faculty members being recognized with an impressive number of regional and national teaching awards. In 2003, UPEI created the Webster Centre for Teaching and Learning. When MacLauchlan completed his eleven-year term as president in 2011, his service was recognized through the creation of two new series of student awards. Up to sixty MacLauchlan Prizes for Effective Writing are presented annually to UPEI students who excel in coursework writing across the disciplines or in community-oriented writing. The H. Wade MacLauchlan Raised Expectations Awards go to the Grade 12 graduating student from each P.E.I. high school who demonstrates the greatest improvement in academic achievement from Grade 10 to the completion of Grade 12 and who goes on to study at UPEI.

MacLauchlan encountered criticism from the Canadian Society for Academic Freedom and Scholarship for a 2006 decision to halt distribution on campus of an edition of the student newspaper, The Cadre, which reprinted controversial cartoons of Muhammad published in a Danish newspaper in September 2005. The UPEI Student Union, the owner of the Cadre, initially supported the newspaper's decision to publish the cartoons, but after meetings with MacLauchlan and other student groups, offered an apology to the PEI Muslim community and rounded up the remaining copies of the newspaper.

In the fall of 2010, MacLauchlan led vocal opposition to an initiative by the PEI government that proposed to amend the University Act to permit the creation of additional university-status institutions in the province, specifically to permit developer Richard Homburg to create a degree-granting real estate university. The provincial government decided against proceeding with the controversial changes.

MacLauchlan's presidency was a period of major infrastructure development at UPEI. The first major project was a much-needed new Student Centre located at the front of campus. This was followed by new and refurbished residences, a new school of business, a complex for applied health sciences, a major expansion of the veterinary college, the NRC institute and research complex, a major community-university arena and aquatics facility, new playing fields and a track and field facility for the 2009 Canada Summer Games, and an overall upgrade of campus grounds and facilities in accordance with a first-ever Campus Master Plan. MacLauchlan took pride in saying that these infrastructure improvements were achieved while leaving UPEI with no unfunded debt, reflecting the considerable public and private funding contributions secured under his leadership.

MacLauchlan served a number of years as an executive member of the Association of Universities and Colleges of Canada (AUCC) and as a member and chair of AUCC's Standing Advisory Committee on International Relations. As UPEI president, MacLauchlan served as a member of the Executive of the Association of Atlantic Universities including twice as chair of the AAU. He served on the board of Atlantic University Sport, including five years as chair.

When MacLauchlan was in his eleventh year as UPEI president, he was interviewed by Gordon Pitts of the Globe and Mail on the subject of leadership. MacLauchlan responded to a question from Pitts about the role of universities in economic growth by saying, "It's never been more important to do what we do and do more of it – in terms of moving to the emerging economy and what will pay the bills in the 21st century." In concluding the interview, Pitts asked, "What is your legacy?" MacLauchlan responded, "Higher expectation. It wouldn't have been uncommon if you talked to Grade 12 students in PEI 15 years ago, to hear them say, 'I'm just going to UPEI.' The 'just' is gone now." In 2015, when MacLauchlan was interviewed by the national university publication University Affairs about legacies, following a presentation to current university presidents, he had this to say, "I think the overall piece is raised expectations. It's not [from] me alone, of course. It comes through a collective effort and you have to get your timing right. By raised expectations I mean for students, professors and the community to see a greater role for the university, to see a greater opportunity to achieve and, ultimately, to be able to measure how others see you."

After UPEI & Author 
After completing his 12-year term as UPEI's longest-serving president, MacLauchlan retired from the university at the end of 2011 and was named president emeritus. He stayed active in public affairs and debates. In a January 2013 opinion essay in the Charlottetown Guardian entitled "P.E.I. needs immigration and a population strategy," MacLauchlan emphasized a sense of urgency, saying "As things are currently lined up, P.E.I. faces two demographic certainties: there will be fewer of us, and we will be older. These are both barriers to growth." Later in the op-ed, MacLauchlan said, "If P.E.I.'s history could be summed up in three words, it would be: 'Grow or go.' Without opportunities to grow and prosper, people leave."

MacLauchlan became a member of the "Connectors" Committee of the Greater Charlottetown Chamber of Commerce and served as co-chair of the 2013 Georgetown Conference, held in Georgetown, PEI on 3–5 October 2013 and dedicated to the theme Redefining Rural. The Georgetown Conference was founded by Paul MacNeil, publisher of the Eastern Graphic, and developed under the umbrella of Newspapers Atlantic, a regional association representing 70 predominately rural community newspapers, with a combined weekly circulation of 730,000. The Conference attracted delegates from communities throughout the four Atlantic Provinces and speakers from across Canada, aiming to develop action plans and networks to promote rural revitalization and sustainability of rural communities throughout the region.

MacLauchlan's main activity during the post-UPEI period was to research, write and publish the political biography of Alex B. Campbell, who was PEI's longest-serving premier from 1966 to 1978. Alex B. Campbell: The Prince Edward Island Premier Who Rocked the Cradle was released in print edition in May 2014. In researching the book, MacLauchlan conducted more than 70 interviews with political and bureaucratic actors from the period, as well as family and friends of Alex B. Campbell. He spent many hours interviewing Campbell himself and sifted through thousands of archival documents, photographs and public media records. In November 2014, an audio version of the book, recorded primarily by MacLauchlan, with passages from actor Gracie Finley, artistic director Duncan McIntosh and with Alex B. Campbell reading from his speeches and singing.

In November 2012, MacLauchlan was elected as a councillor of the rural Municipality of North Shore. He was re-elected by acclamation in November 2014. From 2013 to 2015, MacLauchlan served as a board member of the Federation of Municipalities of Prince Edward Island.

From 2008 to 2015, MacLauchlan served as a director of Medavie Inc. and Medavie Health Services. In 2009, he became a director of the Medavie Health Foundation, later serving as chair of the Foundation, which grew to a $50 million fund embracing child and youth mental health and Type-2 diabetes as its two core areas of support. In 2012, MacLauchlan was named a director of the Windsor Foundation, one of the largest and longest-established private foundations in Atlantic Canada. In 2013–14, MacLauchlan led a fundraising initiative that exceeded its $2 million goal and allowed the CHANCES Family Centre to pay off the mortgage on its central facility, named in honour of Hon. Catherine Callbeck.

PEI Premier
On 13 November 2014, Liberal premier Robert Ghiz unexpectedly announced that he would resign upon the selection of a new Liberal leader. Two weeks later, Wade MacLauchlan was joined at the North Shore Community Centre in his home community by 19 of 23 Liberal caucus members for the announcement that he would be a candidate for the party leadership. He declared, "We have challenges: fiscal, economic, demographic, environmental and others," and said that he wanted to lead a government that would square up to those challenges and a province that he offered to serve as "optimist-in-chief."

He was the sole candidate at the close of nominations on 20 January 2015, and was acclaimed leader on 21 February 2015. In his acceptance speech to the leadership convention, MacLauchlan emphasized economic growth, demographic change, and open government, telling the audience, "Prosperity starts with growing our economy."

MacLauchlan was sworn in as the 32nd Premier of Prince Edward Island, on 23 February 2015. In addition to serving as premier, MacLauchlan assumed the roles of Minister of Finance and Energy, as well as Minister of Intergovernmental, Aboriginal and Francophone Affairs in an eight-member cabinet.

Questions of ethics and government accountability that had dogged the Liberal administration of Robert Ghiz became issues for MacLauchlan's government from its first weeks in office. The Ghiz government's initiative to establish PEI as an e-gaming jurisdiction and efforts to create a financial hub were kept in the limelight by newly selected PC leader Rob Lantz and by investigative journalists. MacLauchlan asked PEI's auditor-general to review the matters and introduced conflict-of-interest reforms aimed at improving government transparency and accountability, saying the province needed to restore public confidence and trust.

MacLauchlan led the Liberals to a majority in a 4 May, 2015 general election, winning 18 of 27 seats in the PEI Legislative Assembly. The Progressive Conservative party increased its standing to 8 seats and the Green party elected its first-ever Island MLA. MacLauchlan was elected as MLA for York-Oyster Bed, a seat previously held by his chief of staff Robert Vessey. The Liberal platform built on the theme "Let's Work Together" and around the pillars "People, Prosperity, Engagement," promising aggressive business development initiatives, as well as a first-ever arts and culture strategy and a population action plan.

The new cabinet saw a mix of seasoned and first-time ministers, with MacLauchlan taking on the role of minister of justice and attorney general in the place of the finance portfolio. The Legislature met for a June sitting, which included the adoption of the 2015–16 provincial budget and tabling of a white paper on democratic renewal. One of the first acts of the new government, prior to the legislative sitting, was to announce that PEI would fund abortions on a self-referral basis through an agreement with Moncton Hospital. This was considered "big news for the Island but a small first step" by abortion-rights advocates. In March 2016, the PEI government announced, in response to a constitutional challenge, the creation of a self-referring Women's Health Centre that would offer abortions on the Island for the first time in almost forty years, along with a range of reproductive health services.

An early challenge for the MacLauchlan government was the need to install new power transmission cables under the Northumberland Strait between New Brunswick and PEI, to expand the capacity of existing 40 year-old cables and address concerns about their age and condition. MacLauchlan described this as the province's top infrastructure priority but was unwilling to settle for the maximum funding of $50 million offered by the Harper federal government toward what eventually became a $142.5 million project. After the 2015 federal election, the Trudeau government agreed to share the cost. When the project was completed in August 2017, MacLauchlan said it meant "an energy system for Prince Edward Island that is reliable, affordable and increasingly renewable."

A plebiscite on electoral reform in November 2016 cost the MacLauchlan government political capital, as did a school review conducted in the winter of 2017. On the recommendation of an all-party legislative committee, the electoral reform plebiscite offered Islanders five choices through a preferential voting or ranked-ballot system. After four rounds, the majority of votes (52.4%) were cast in favour of mixed member proportional representation [MMP]. Because participation in the plebiscite was very low by PEI standards at 36.46%, the MacLauchlan government introduced legislation to have the matter settled through a yes-or-no referendum on MMP to be held in conjunction with the 2019 provincial election. While the referendum eventually went against MMP, the process "turned what was a dormant issue into a lightning rod of general public frustration." In the fall of 2016 and winter of 2017, a periodic review of school zoning and populations by the PEI Public Schools Branch attracted considerable public opposition to the proposed closure of five schools. At the conclusion of the process, the trustees recommended to cabinet that two of the five schools be closed but the government opted to keep the schools open. MacLauchlan said the decision was guided by a "learner-centred" approach. The PC opposition called the process a "sham". MacLauchlan responded that the review had resulted in a commitment to the "development and growth of our communities and our population in all parts of this province."

MacLauchlan's two main priorities in government were to expand and diversify the PEI economy and grow and rejuvenate the province's population. From 2015 to 2019, PEI led all provinces for economic growth, expanding by a cumulative 16 per cent in real terms over the five years, while the total Canadian economy grew by 9 per cent during the same period. These gains translated into significant growth in employment. From May 2015 to December 2019, PEI saw the creation of 8,500 new full-time jobs, equal to 14.2% of the local labour market. The growth came predominantly in the private sector, with substantial increases in manufacturing, construction, agriculture, fisheries, tourism, transportation and wholesale trade.

The economic and job growth came with increased population. For each year from 2015–2016 through 2018–19, PEI led all provinces for rates of growth for population and immigration. PEI's population grew by 9 per cent from 144,546 in 2015 to 156,947 in 2019. For the first time since 1968, the median age of Prince Edward Islanders declined. After watching its median age increase without exception from 1969 to 2016, rising from 25 to 44, PEI became the only Canadian province to see its median age decrease for three consecutive years, dropping to 43.2 in 2019.

PEI's population growth and rejuvenation brought with it an increased demand for housing. In the fall of 2013, PEI's rental vacancy rate was 7.1%. By the end of 2018, PEI had the lowest rental vacancy rate in Canada, at 0.2%, causing many to refer to the situation as a housing crisis. In March 2018, the MacLauchlan government released a five-year Housing Action Plan, developed in conjunction with a provincial Housing Supply Task Force appointed in late 2017. The Action Plan committed to a range of programs and partnerships, including investments in new affordable housing for the first time since the early 1990s and a tripling of income-sensitive rent supplements. In 2019, a record number of new residential units were constructed, and the provincial rental vacancy rate rose to 1.2%.

Some of the major initiatives of the MacLauchlan government included passage of PEI's first-ever Water Act, which some commentators said could be a model for the rest of the country, and a new Municipal Government Act replacing legislation first adopted in 1947. A new Business Corporations Act and registry replaced a Companies Act with origins in the 1880s. The province undertook its first comprehensive review of policing in decades, and a new Education Act replaced legislation from the early 1970s. In the area of open government, Prince Edward Island adopted its first-ever whistle-blower protection legislation, a lobbyist registry and the modernization of limits on political contributions.

Energy and climate change were prominent issues during MacLauchlan's time as premier, starting with meetings of Canada's premiers in the summer of 2015 that finalized the Canadian Energy Strategy. A November 2015 meeting of first ministers, the first in seven years, was a prelude to participation in the December 2015 conference that produced the Paris Agreement among 196 state parties. First ministers meetings in Vancouver in March 2016 and Ottawa in December moved toward the Pan Canadian Agreement on Clean Energy and Climate Change. Building on an extensive research and consultation, PEI released a ten-year Provincial Energy Strategy in March 2016, and a 32-point Climate Change Action Plan in May 2018. The MacLauchlan government introduced extensive programs and incentives aimed at achieving greater energy efficiency. PEI was one of only three provinces to achieve reduced GHG emissions from 2017 to 2018, with a 1.5 per cent decline in emissions, despite a 2.1 per cent increase in population and a 2.8 per cent increase in economic growth over 2017.

When he became Liberal party leader and during the 2015 election campaign, Wade MacLauchlan made a commitment to lead a government would "live within its means." After running a $13 million deficit in 2015–16, PEI had balanced budgets that turned into historic surpluses of $75 million in 2017–18 and $57 million in 2018–19. Over a four-year period, there were investments totalling $750 million by all levels of government in public infrastructure in Prince Edward Island. The province's share of these capital investments was financed without increasing the provincial net debt and while reducing the province's debt-to-GDP ratio from 36.7% in 2015 to 30.5% in 2019, leaving PEI with the lowest debt-to-GDP ratio of any province east of Saskatchewan. In August 2020, the bond rating agency DBRS upgraded PEI's credit rating for the first time in two decades. These results were achieved while annual budgets extended tax relief measures and increased program funding, with the significant majority of new expenditure going toward enhanced social programs, education and health care.

MacLauchlan's Liberals trailed in the polls going in to the 2019 provincial election. The environment was uncertain with the recent selection of Dennis King as Progressive Conservative leader in February 2019 and the suspension of campaigning during the final weekend as a result of the tragic death of Green party candidate Josh Underhay. The theme of the MacLauchlan Liberals' platform was, "PEI is Working; Let's Keep Working." With slightly less than normal voter turnout for PEI at under 80%, the election resulted in PEI's first minority government in more than a century. The Progressive Conservatives captured 12 seats (later 13, with the results of the deferred election) and 37% of the vote, the Greens 8 seats and 31%, and the Liberals 6 seats and 30%. MacLauchlan lost by 104 votes in his district of Stanhope-Marshfield and announced two days later that he would step down as Liberal party leader upon selection of an interim leader.

Personal life, Community involvement, Honours and awards 
Wade MacLauchlan was the first openly gay Premier of Prince Edward Island, and the first openly gay man to be premier of a province. He lives with his partner, theatrical director and entrepreneur Duncan McIntosh, in West Covehead, PEI, the neighbouring community to his native Stanhope.

MacLauchlan was the first person in Canada to be a member of the Order of Canada prior to leading a government, having been inducted as a member of Order in 2008. In 2014, he was named to the Order of Prince Edward Island. In 2010, he received the Lieutenant Governor's Institute of Public Administration of Canada Award for Excellence in Public Administration. In 2013, MacLauchlan was an inaugural recipient of the Frank McKenna Award for outstanding contributions to public policy by Atlantic Canadians conferred by the Public Policy Forum of Canada.

He is the first person to have become a Member of the Order of Canada prior to becoming a provincial premier.

MacLauchlan has served on various national and regional organizations. He served as vice-president of the Canadian Institute for the Administration of Justice; as an executive member of the Association of Universities and Colleges of Canada (AUCC) and chair of AUCC's Standing Advisory Committee on International Relations; as board member of the Public Policy Forum of Canada; as board member of the Atlantic Provinces Economic Council (APEC); as a member of the Atlantic Gateway Advisory Council; as executive member and chair of the Association of Atlantic Universities (AAU); and, as board member and chair of Atlantic University Sport (AUS). While premier, MacLauchlan served as chair of the Council of the Federation in 2015 and chair of the New England Governors and Eastern Canadian Premiers in 2017.

MacLauchlan chaired the founding committee of the Palmer Conference on Public Sector Leadership and was actively involved, including as chair, with the first three Palmer Conferences: Public Servants and their Relationships with Politicians and the Media (2010), Developing a Canadian Energy Strategy (2011), and Canadian Immigration Law and Policy (2012).

Prior to getting into political life, MacLauchlan was a board member of the Windsor Foundation and as an inaugural director and later chair of the Medavie Health Foundation, which identified child and youth mental health and Type-2 diabetes as priority areas for support. While at UNB, MacLauchlan was a founding director of the Muriel McQueen Fergusson Foundation for Eliminating Family Violence and chaired the committee for the.  150th Anniversary of the Law Society of New Brunswick. While at Dalhousie, he served on the board of the Dalhousie Legal Aid Clinic and was a founding member of the Nova Scotia chapter of Lawyers for Social Responsibility.

MacLauchlan has been involved in various business endeavours, including family businesses and as an investor in several start-up technology firms based on PEI. He is a director of Anne in China Inc., which translated Anne of Green Gables into Mandarin and published it in China in 2011. The book was shortlisted by the country's national publishers' association as one of the most influential novels published in China in 2012. He is director and president of a local land development company, Covehead Development Inc.

See also

List of openly LGBT heads of government
List of the first LGBT holders of political offices in Canada

References

1954 births
Living people
Prince Edward Island Liberal Party leaders
Premiers of Prince Edward Island
Gay politicians
LGBT governors and heads of sub-national entities
Male biographers
Members of the Executive Council of Prince Edward Island
Members of the Order of Canada
Members of the Order of Prince Edward Island
Canadian biographers
Canadian male non-fiction writers
University of Prince Edward Island
University of New Brunswick alumni
Academic staff of the University of New Brunswick
Academic staff of the Dalhousie University
Yale Law School alumni
Canadian university and college chief executives
Canadian LGBT people in provincial and territorial legislatures
Prince Edward Island Liberal Party MLAs
Gay academics
Canadian gay writers
People from Queens County, Prince Edward Island
Writers from Prince Edward Island
21st-century Canadian politicians
21st-century Canadian LGBT people
Canadian LGBT academics